Leurotrigona muelleri, commonly known as the lambe-olhos bee (Brazilian Portuguese: "eye-licking bee"), is a species of small eusocial stingless bee in the family Apidae and tribe Meliponini.

References 

Meliponini
Hymenoptera of South America
Hymenoptera of Brazil
Insects described in 1900